The 2011–12 Algerian Ligue Professionnelle 1 was the 50th season of the Algerian Ligue Professionnelle 1 since its establishment in 1962. A total of 16 teams contested the league, with ASO Chlef as the defending champions. The league started on 6 September 2011, and ended on 22 May 2012.

While the league was originally scheduled to start on 10 September 2011, the official start date will be 6 September 2011, with a match between JS Kabylie and MC Alger. The tie was moved up due to the two club's participation in African competition.

Team summaries

Promotion and relegation 
Teams promoted from 2010–11 Algerian Ligue Professionnelle 2
 CS Constantine
 NA Hussein Dey
 CA Batna

Teams relegated to 2011-12 Algerian Ligue Professionnelle 2
 USM Annaba
 CA Bordj Bou Arréridj
 USM Blida

Stadiums and locations

League table

Season statistics

Top scorers

References

External links
Season at soccerway.com

Algerian Ligue Professionnelle 1 seasons
Algeria
1